The 1993 Milwaukee cryptosporidiosis outbreak was a significant distribution of the Cryptosporidium protozoan in Milwaukee, Wisconsin, and the largest waterborne disease outbreak in documented United States history. It is suspected that The Howard Avenue Water Purification Plant, one of two water treatment plants in Milwaukee at the time, was contaminated. It is believed that the contamination was due to an ineffective filtration process. Approximately 403,000 residents were affected resulting in illness and hospitalization. Immediate repairs were made to the treatment facilities along with continued infrastructure upgrades during the 25 years since the outbreak. The total cost of the outbreak, in productivity loss and medical expenses, was $96 million. At least 69 people died as a result of the outbreak.

The city of Milwaukee has spent upwards to $510 million in repairs, upgrades, and outreach to citizens.

Epidemiology 
On April 5, 1993, Milwaukee Health Department received increased reports of gastrointestinal illness at their local hospitals and calls of complaints related to reduced water-quality aesthetic. Water aesthetics include taste, color, odor, hardness/softness, and turbidity. They are considered a secondary standard under the EPA National Primary Drinking Water Regulations (NPDWR). Although these drinking aesthetics are under the EPA NPDWR, they are not federally enforced but are standard regulations that states may choose to adopt and enforce themselves. Public health officials suspected recent illness to be due to water consumption. To verify suspicions, both the water treatment plants complied with data 30 days prior to the incident. The only findings were that turbidity was slightly increased but still below federally recommended levels. At the same time, hospitals did not routinely screen for Cryptosporidium, but because patients were all experiencing similar symptoms, hospitals were asked to test for Cryptosporidium.

Cryptosporidium is a chlorine-resistant enteric pathogen that causes a gastrointestinal illness (cryptosporidiosis) with symptoms such as diarrhea. Independent tests were run through the Milwaukee Public Health Laboratory, to test stool samples for Cryptosporidium. On April 7, two days after initial reports, Mayor John Norquist issued a ten-day boil order for resident to boil their drinking water, though it still left residents vulnerable to Cryptosporidium through bathing, showering, and washing hands or clothes.

The root cause of epidemic was never officially identified; however, it was most likely the result of human error at the Howard Avenue Water Treatment Plant. Initially it was suspected to be caused by the cattle genotype due to runoff from pastures.  It was also thought that melting ice and snowmelt carrying Cryptosporidium may have entered the water treatment plants through Lake Michigan. MacKenzie et al. and the CDC showed that this outbreak was caused by Cryptosporidium oocysts that passed through the filtration system of one of the city's water-treatment plants, arising from a sewage treatment plant's outlet 2 miles upstream in Lake Michigan. This abnormal condition at the water purification plant lasted from March 23 through April 8, after which, the plant was shut down. Over the span of approximately two weeks, 403,000 of an estimated 1.61 million residents in the Milwaukee area (of which 880,000 were served by the malfunctioning treatment plant) became ill with the stomach cramps, fever, diarrhea and dehydration caused by the pathogen. After the outbreak, cryptosporidiosis antibody rates among Milwaukee children reached 80%, compared to only 10% prior to the outbreak. Deaths have been attributed to this outbreak, mostly among the elderly and immunocompromised people, such as people with AIDS.

See also 

 1987 Carroll County Cryptosporidiosis outbreak
 Pryor Avenue Iron Well
 Water supply

References 
       
5. Osewe, P., Addiss, D., Blair, K., Hightower, A., Kamb, M., & Davis, J. (1996). Cryptosporidiosis in Wisconsin: A case-control study of post-outbreak transmission. Epidemiology and Infection, 117(2), 297–304. doi:10.1017/S0950268800001473
6. Milwaukee, 1993: The Largest Documented Waterborne Disease Outbreak in US History. (2014, January 10). Water Quality and Health Council. https://waterandhealth.org/safe-drinking-water/drinking-water/milwaukee-1993-largest-documented-waterborne-disease-      outbreak-history/

External links 
 CDC Cryptosporidium
 EPA Surface Water Drinking Rules
 Drinking Water Requirements for States and Public Water Systems
 Milwaukee Health Department Lab
 Cryptosporidium and public health (Drinking Water and Health Newsletter)
 Cost of Illness in the 1993 Waterborne Cryptosporidium Outbreak, Milwaukee, Wisconsin (CDC)
  A Massive Outbreak in Milwaukee of Cryptosporidium Infection Transmitted through the Public Water Supply

Cryptosporidiosis
1993 disasters in the United States
Milwaukee Cryptosporidiosis outbreak
Milwaukee Cryptosporidiosis outbreak
1993 disease outbreaks
March 1993 events in the United States
April 1993 events in the United States
Disease outbreaks in the United States